Brian Edward Winters (born July 10, 1991) is an American football offensive guard who is a free agent. He was drafted by the New York Jets in the third round of the 2013 NFL Draft. He played college football at Kent State. He also played for the Buffalo Bills and the Arizona Cardinals.

Early years
Winters attended Hudson High School in Hudson, Ohio, and played high school football for the Hudson Explorers.  He received All-Ohio and All-Northeast Ohio Conference honors his senior season, after being named all-conference his junior year.  In addition to lettering in football twice, Winters also lettered three times in wrestling, and was named all-conference in wrestling his freshman and sophomore years.  Rated as only a two-star recruit by Rivals.com, he accepted a scholarship offer from Kent State over offers from Akron and Syracuse.

College career
Winters enrolled in Kent State University, where he played for the Kent State Golden Flashes football team from 2009 to 2012.  He started every game after joining the Golden Flashes in 2009, 50 in total.  He was named to the All-Mid-American Conference (MAC) team three times during his career: third-team as a sophomore, second-team as a junior, and first-team as a senior.

Professional career

New York Jets
Winters was drafted by the New York Jets in the third round, with the 72nd overall pick, of the 2013 NFL Draft.

On May 10, 2013, Winters signed a four-year deal with the Jets. He started 12 games as a rookie.

On October 13, 2014, against the Denver Broncos, Winters left the game with a knee injury. The next day, an MRI revealed a torn ACL, prematurely ending his 2014 season.

In his first year as the full-time starter at right guard, Winters started 13 games in 2016. On October 2, 2016, against the Seattle Seahawks, Winters hit defensive end Michael Bennett head-to-head after a play, which drew a personal foul (15 yard penalty) and caused him to leave the game with concussion symptoms. He was placed on injured reserve on December 20, 2016.

On January 16, 2017, Winters signed a four-year contract extension with the Jets.

Winters started 13 games at right guard in 2017. He suffered an abdomen injury in Week 2, and played through the injury for most of the year before being placed on injured reserve on December 27, 2017.

On November 12, 2019, Winters was placed on injured reserve after a season-ending injury.

Winters was released by the Jets on August 2, 2020, after seven seasons with the team.

Buffalo Bills
On August 6, 2020, Winters signed with the Buffalo Bills after starting right guard Jon Feliciano suffered a torn pectoral muscle.

Arizona Cardinals
On March 24, 2021, Winters signed with the Arizona Cardinals on a one-year contract. He was released on September 25, 2021.

References

External links
Kent State Golden Flashes Bio

1991 births
Living people
American football offensive guards
American football offensive tackles
Buffalo Bills players
Kent State Golden Flashes football players
New York Jets players
People from Hudson, Ohio
Players of American football from Ohio
Arizona Cardinals players